Milk is a 2008 Turkish drama film directed by Semih Kaplanoglu.

Cast 
 Melih Selcuk - Yusuf
 Başak Köklükaya - Zehra
 Rıza Akın - Ali Hoca
 Saadet Aksoy - Semra

References

External links 

2008 drama films
2008 films
Films set in İzmir
Films shot in İzmir
Turkish drama films